99% is the seventh studio album by the Spanish ska punk band Ska-P. It was released on 5 March 2013.

Writing and production 
The album is the second after the band's re-reunion in 2008. The title is a reference to power and union workers. The album features synthesizer and some influences of jazz music and ballad-esque intros.

Track listing

Personnel 
 Pulpul – lead vocals, guitars, backing vocals
 Luismi – drums, backing vocals
 Julio – bass, backing vocals
 Joxemi – guitar, backing vocals
 Kogote – keyboards, backing vocals
 Pipi – second lead and backing vocals

Additional musicians 
 Albert Pérez – trumpet
 Garikoizt Badiola – trombone
 Juanan Rivas Sabriega – trumpet and violin
 Jorge Rodrígez "Chino" – tenor and baritone saxophone

Additional personnel 
 Tony López – producer
 Marisa Martín – executive producer and producing assistant
 Rubén Suárez – recording & sound engineer, mixing & mastering
Alicia, Carolina & Erik: choir on "Ali Ba Ba"
Gaby Magaña (Shaiko) – programming and "great ideas"
Pipi & Maki – band pictures
Vizcarra – illustrations

Release history

External links 
Ska-P's official website

Ska-P albums
2013 albums